Abū al-ʻAbbās Ahmad ibn Muhammad at-Tijāniyy or Ahmed Tijani (1735–1815), was an Algerian Sharif who founded the Tijaniyyah tariqa (Sufi order).

Life
Tijani was born in 1735 in Ain Madi, the son of Muhammad al-Mukhtar. He traced his descent according to the Berber custom, to his mother's tribe, Tijania. When he was sixteen, Tijani lost both parents as a result of a plague. By then he was already married. He learned Quran under the tutelage of Mohammed Ba'afiyya in Ain Madi and also studied Khalil ibn Ishaq al-Jundi's Islamic jusrispudence works that were written under Malikite rites. He also studied Abū al-Qāsim al-Qushayrī's Risala ila al-sufiyya. In 1757, Tijani left his village for Fez. While there, he joined three Sufi brotherhoods, the Qadiriyya, the Nasiriyya, and the tariqa of Ahmad al-Habib b. Muhammed. In Fez, he met a seer who told him he would achieve spiritual revelation (fath). Thereafter, he left Fez to teach at al-Abiad, spending five years at the village. In 1772, he began a journey to Mecca for hajj and to seek a Sufi way of life. During his journey, he was initiated into the Khalwati order at Azwawi. He later taught for a year at Tunis where he achieved some success. He left Tunis for Egypt where he met Mahmud al-Kurdi of the Khalwati order in Cairo. Tijani reached Mecca in late 1773 and performed hajj rites. In his quest to seek a Sufi way of life, he met Sheikh Ahmad Abdullah El Hindi, who rarely saw people except for his servant. He also met Abd-karim al-Sammman, founder of the Sammaniyya branch of Khalwati. Al-Samman told Tijani he will become a dominant qutb (pole) or scholar within the Sufi orders in the region. Tijani left Mecca and returned to Cairo where he got al-Kurdi's blessing to preach the Khalwatiyya order. From Cairo he settled at Tlemcen for a couple of years.

Tijani later settled at Boussemghoun, an oasis seventy five miles south of El Bayadh. It was at Samghun that Tijani received a vision from the prophet who told him to start a new Sufi order. He left his previous affiliations with other Sufi orders and claimed divine instructions from prophet Mohammed, Thus, the year 1781 marks the beginning of the Tijaniyya order. Tijani's order soon gained attraction in the desert regions surrounding Abi Samghun. Shaykh Tijani lived in Abi Samghun for about fifteen years. In 1796 he went to Fez.

In Fez, Tijani was well received by Mawlay Sulayman, the Moroccan Sultan. Though Sulayman disliked other Sufi orders, he provided Tijani a house and appointed him as a member of his learned council. At first, Tijani chose the mosque of Mawlay Idris to pray but performed the rites of the Tijani order in his house. Tijani later built his own zawiya. In Fez, he sent his trusted aides to spread the word of his order. Trusted aides such as Abu Hafs' Abdul-Rahman was sent to Oran and Algiers and Abdul-Salam al-Waghiri to Constantine, Algeria. Further muqaddams were appointed among learned converts including Muhammad Fuwadir al-Abdallawi in the Jarid district of Tunisia and Muhammed al-Hafiz in Mauritania.

Tijani assigned to himself the title of Qutb al-Aqtab (or the Pole of the Poles) and Khatm al-Walayya al-Muhammadiyya (or the Seal of Muhammadan Sainthood).

Seal of sainthood
He is quoted as saying

Sources on the life of Al-Tijani
The greater part of the life and teaching of Shaykh Tijani can be drawn from two primary hagiographical works:
Kitab Jawahir al-ma'ani wa-bulugh al-amani fi fayd Sidi Abil al-Abbas at-Tijani (Gems of Indications and Attainment of Aspirations in the Overflowings of Sidi Abil Abbas Tijani) by Sidi Ali Harazem Berrada (d. 1797), and
Kitab al-Jami’a li-ma f-taraqa mina-l 'ulumn (The Absolute in What Has Separated from the Sciences) by Sidi Mohammed ibn al-Mishri Sibai Hassani Idrissi (d. 1809).

Later hagiographies tend to be works of compilation drawn from these two primary sources. Such hagiographies are:
Kitab Rima'h al-Hizb al Rahim ala Nuhur Hizb ar-Rajim (The Spears of the League of the Merciful thrown at the Necks of the League of the Accursed) by Sidi Omar ibn Said al-Futi (d.1864),
 Kitab Bughyat al-mustafid li-shar'h minyat al-murid (Aspiration of the Beneficiary in Commenting the 'Demise of the Disciple') by Sidi Mohammed ibn al-Arbi Sayeh (d.1894), and last but not least,
Kitab Kashf al-Hijab 'amman talaaqa bi-Shaykh Tijani mina-l As'hab (Raising the Veil of the Companions who encountered with Shaykh Tijani) by Sidi Ahmed ibn al-'Iyyashi Skirej al-Fasi (d.1940).

Most of what we know about Shaykh Tijani comes from these books.

See also

 Tijaniyya
 List of Sufis
 List of Ash'aris and Maturidis

Notes

References
Davidson, Basil; Africa in History. New York: Simon & Schuster, 1995.
John Esposito (2003), The Oxford Dictionary of Islam
Nasr, Jamil Abun; The Tiyânniya. A Sufi Order in the Modern World,Oxford, 1965
Jean-Louis Michon (1999), The Autobiography of a Moroccan Soufi: Ahmad ibn 'Ajiba (1747–1809)
Triaud, Jean and Robinson, David (eds.); La Tijâniyya: Une confrérie musulmane à la conquête de l"Afrique. Paris: Karthala, 2000
Trimingham, J. Spencer; The Sufi Orders in Islam,

External links
Wright, Zachary; On the Path of the Prophet: Shaykh Ahmad Tijani and the Tariqa Muhammadiyya  Atlanta, 2005, pp. 24–77.
Ahmad al-Tijani site
Al-Qutb al-Maktum Mawlana Abul Abbas Ahmed Tijani
A letter from Shaykh Ahmad Tijani
 Website of Pr. Abdelaziz Benabdallah
 Le Tawhid des Awliya par le Shaykh Ahmad At Tijani
 Al Haqiqat Ul Muhammadiyyah par le Shaykh Ahmad At Tijani

Tijaniyyah order
Founders of Sufi orders
Algerian Maliki scholars
Asharis
Sunni imams
Sunni Muslim scholars of Islam
Sunni Sufis
Algerian Sufis
People from Laghouat Province
Berber Algerians
Berber Muslims
1737 births
1815 deaths